Clara Conway (August 14, 1844 – November 16, 1904) was an American teacher and political activist. She founded the Clara Conway Institute for Girls in Memphis, Tennessee and was a founding member of the Nineteenth Century Club in 1890.

Early life 
Clara Conway was born in New Orleans, Louisiana on August 14, 1844. She attended the St. Agnes Academy in Memphis, but received most of her education at home. She moved to Memphis, Tennessee in 1864.

Conway began her career as a public school teacher. Developing a strong interest in providing women with a quality education, Conway was the first Tennessee woman to assist in the organization of teachers' institutes, and the first southern woman to attend the teachers' summer school in the North, when she took classes at Martha's Vineyard Summer Institute.

Conway later became principal of the Alabama Street School and the Market Street School. In 1873, Conway was proposed for superintendent of public schools in Memphis as part of a political fight to have female educators recognized for their merits. Conway did not get the position and female educators did not receive equal pay, but the controversial event was a critical moment connecting female empowerment to the larger community.

Conway remained heavily involved in educational issues for women, speaking publicly at the National Educational Association in Madison, Wisconsin, on the needs of southern women in 1884 and 1886, and in 1887 she was elected a member of the National Council.

Political activism 
Conway's brand of activism was less based on maternalism than much of women's political activism of the time period. Her activism was motivated by women's independence. Conway argued that a woman's duty is first and foremost to herself, not to her husband, which was a common viewpoint even among female activists.

In 1889, Conway and Nellie O'Donnell, a newly elected female school superintendent, traveled to Nashville to personally face sexist male legislators who had introduced bills prohibiting women from becoming superintendents. Scores of female educators and prominent citizens rallied to support the women, and the bill was defeated. Instead, a bill was passed confirming women's eligibility as school superintendents.

In 1890, Conway was among a group of elite women in Memphis that founded the Nineteenth Century Club, a women's club that aimed to improve city life and public services.

Clara Conway Institute 

In 1877, Conway left to open a private high school for girls. The school began with only 50 pupils and one assistant, and immediately became successful. The aim of Conway's school was to help women become economically independent through a solid education. She believed that by acquiring an education, women could "take part in the work of the world." She explained, "The stale, worn-out argument that higher education detracts from womanliness has lost its force... Everywhere one sees high bred women in careers. Independence is one of the highest attributes of womanhood.

By 1884, the school had expanded to 250 pupils, leading to the incorporation of the school and its naming of the Clara Conway Institute. The Board of Trustees included some of the most influential businessmen in the city, and by 1888, the school had over 300 young women enrolled and 26 faculty members. The school became known for its progressive and innovative approach to education, and included a fine reference library, a gymnasium, a science lab, and a complete arts studio. Courses included voice, piano, theory, and public speaking. The school also operated the first kindergarten program in Memphis. The school became a major college preparatory school for young women. The school closed in 1893 over a disagreement between Conway's ambitions and trustees. The financial backers thought she aimed too high for her graduates.

Later life 
After the closure of the school, Conway helped organize the General Federation of Women's Clubs, a council of women representing several women's organizations, with the goal of creating a southern college for women that would be equal to the northern schools like Vassar or Wellesley. She spent the later years of her life teaching and campaigning for women's higher education at the state and national level until her death in 1904.

Legacy 
Conway's influence on her students continued long after her death. One student described her thus:

Once in a generation there is born one who envisions conditions as they should be - a dreamer. Such as this was Clara Conway... To most of us she sat Minerva-like upon a mystic throne - incomparably wise, brilliant and resourceful, impressing upon each one who passed within the space of her influence the importance of her motto. "Neglect not the gift that is within thee," or that other motto she loved so well, "Influence is responsibility."

The latter motto eventually was adopted by the Nineteenth Century Club that Conway helped found.

After Conway's death in 1904, the Clara Conway Alumnae Association constructed the Clara Conway Memorial Pergola on the grounds of Overton Park in Memphis, Tennessee. One of the three original elements of Overton Park, the structure was destroyed in a 1936 storm.

References

External links

1844 births
1904 deaths
Founders of schools in the United States
Schoolteachers from Tennessee
19th-century American women educators
Activists from New Orleans
American school principals
Women school principals and headteachers
Clubwomen
Wikipedia articles incorporating text from A Woman of the Century
19th-century American educators
19th-century American philanthropists